Stege and Waidbach are two small rivers in Mecklenburg-Vorpommern, Germany, forming a pseudobifurcation. This means, they are linked by a waterbody that is drained in both directions. The common top section is fed by sources in small valleys at the eastern slope of Kühlung hills. The northern part, Stege, flows into the Mühlenfließ in Bad Doberan. The southern part, Waidbach, flows into the Beke near Ziesendorf.

See also
List of rivers of Mecklenburg-Vorpommern

Rivers of Mecklenburg-Western Pomerania
Rivers of Germany